Events from the year 1599 in Ireland.

Incumbent
Monarch: Elizabeth I

Events
 March 12 – Robert Devereux, 2nd Earl of Essex, is appointed Lord Lieutenant of Ireland by Queen Elizabeth I of England.
 March 27 – Essex leaves London with a large force to pursue a military campaign in Ireland.
 May 29 – Nine Years' War: Essex captures Cahir Castle in Munster.
 August 15 – Nine Years' War: Irish victory over the English at the Battle of Curlew Pass.
 September 8 – Essex in Ireland: Essex signs a truce with Hugh O'Neill, then leaves Ireland against the instructions of Queen Elizabeth.

Births
April 17 – Patrick Fleming, Franciscan ecclesiastical scholar (d. 1631)
Probable date – John Lynch (Gratianus Lucius), Roman Catholic priest and historian (d. c.1677)
 Brian O'Rourke, son of Tadhg O'Rourke of West Breifne and Mary O'Donnell of Tyrconnell. Died in the Tower of London in 1641.

Deaths
January 19 – Richard Bingham, Marshal of Ireland, dies upon arrival in Dublin
August 15 – Conyers Clifford, English commander, killed at Curlew Pass
December 14 – Joan Boyle, first wife of Richard Boyle, 1st Earl of Cork, in childbirth (b. 1578)
December 31 – John Houling, Jesuit, of plague in Lisbon, (b. c.1539)

References

 
1590s in Ireland
Ireland
Years of the 16th century in Ireland